Carex lophocarpa is a tussock-forming species of perennial sedge in the family Cyperaceae. It is native to parts of eastern Australia.

See also
List of Carex species

References

lophocarpa
Plants described in 1908
Taxa named by Charles Baron Clarke
Flora of Queensland
Flora of New South Wales